The 2014 IIHF World Championship Division III was an international ice hockey tournament organized by the International Ice Hockey Federation. It was contested in Luxembourg, Luxembourg, from 6 to 12 April 2014. Division III represents the sixth tier of the Ice Hockey World Championships. Hong Kong returned to the World Championship for the first time since 1987.

Venues

Participants

Standings

Results
All times are local (UTC+2).

Awards and statistics

Awards
Best players selected by the directorate:
 Best Goaltender:  Ho King Chi King
 Best Defenceman:  Clement Waltener
 Best Forward:  Alexei Yotov
Source: IIHF.com

Scoring leaders
List shows the top skaters sorted by points, then goals.

GP = Games played; G = Goals; A = Assists; Pts = Points; +/− = Plus/minus; PIM = Penalties in minutes; POS = PositionSource: IIHF.com

Leading goaltenders
Only the top five goaltenders, based on save percentage, who have played at least 40% of their team's minutes, are included in this list.
TOI = Time on Ice (minutes:seconds); SA = Shots against; GA = Goals against; GAA = Goals against average; Sv% = Save percentage; SO = ShutoutsSource: IIHF.com

References

External links
Division III on IIHF.com

IIHF World Championship Division III
4
2014
IIHF
Sports competitions in Luxembourg City
April 2014 sports events in Europe
2010s in Luxembourg City